

Qualification Summary
* Artistic Gymnastics, NOCs with 6 entered athletes may also enter the team competition.

Qualification timeline

Artistic
An NOC may enter up to 6 men and 6 women athletes. Qualification is based on the results of the 2007 World Artistic Gymnastics Championships.

Men

* Ensure participation of the Host Nation and each continent.

Women 

* Ensure participation of the Host Nation and each continent.

Rhythmic 
An NOC may enter up to 1 Group and 2 athletes for individual competition. Qualification is based on the results of the 2007 World Rhythmic Gymnastics Championships.

Individual

* Ensure participation of the Host Nation and each continent.

Group

* Ensure participation of the Host Nation and each continent.

Trampoline 
An NOC may enter up to 2 men and 2 women athletes. Qualification is based on the results of the 2007 World Championships.

Men 

* Ensure participation of the Host Nation and each continent.

** The tripartite commission invitation was returned to the FIG since no NOC met both the requirements of the commission and the FIG and was awarded to the next eligible federation from the world championships.

Women 

* Ensure participation of the Host Nation and each continent.

** The tripartite commission invitation was returned to the FIG since no NOC met both the requirements of the commission and the FIG and was awarded to the next eligible federation from the world championships.

References
International Gymnastics Federation

Qualification for the 2008 Summer Olympics
Qualification